Norwegian National Road 7 is a national road in Norway which runs from the town of Hønefoss in Viken county to the village of Granvin in Vestland county.

The road begins at the European route E16 highway just south of Heradsbygda in Ringerike municipality and runs through the Sogna river valley to the village of Sokna (this part is called the Soknedalsveien). It then continues further on to Hamremoen and up along the east side of the lake Krøderen to Gulsvik, where it crosses the river and then follows the Hallingdalen valley through Flå, Nesbyen, Gol, Torpo, Ål, Hol, and Geilo (this part is called the Hallingdalsveien). From there, the road begins its path across the Hardangervidda plateau via Ustaoset and Haugastøl, passing the Vøringsfossen waterfall while descending through 4 tunnels (including the 1,893-meter Måbø Tunnel) into the Måbødalen valley in Eidfjord. The road follows the Eid Fjord for a way before crossing the fjord via the Hardanger Bridge (opened in 2013, there was a ferry here prior to that time). The road continues through the Vallavik Tunnel before reaching its terminus at the village of Granvin in Voss Municipality. The portion of the road from Haugestøl to Eidfjord (over the Hardangervidda plateau) is designated a National Tourist Route.

Improvements
Compared to the old road, it includes some long tunnels, is less curved, and shortens the journey between Sokna and Ørgenvika. The Hardanger Bridge (opened in 2013) also shortened the travel time, making Road 7 the fastest option for travelling Oslo–Bergen by road.

References

 
007
Roads in Vestland
Roads in Viken
National Tourist Routes in Norway